Sodom is an unincorporated community in Trumbull County, Ohio, United States.

History
Sodom contained a post office from 1874 until 1903. The community was so named when a temperance activist, remarking on the small turnout at a lecture he delivered, jokingly compared the community to the infamous biblical city of Sodom.

References

Unincorporated communities in Trumbull County, Ohio
1874 establishments in Ohio
Populated places established in 1874
Unincorporated communities in Ohio